This list of the Paleozoic life of Georgia contains the various prehistoric life-forms whose fossilized remains have been reported from within the US state of Georgia and are between 541 and 252.17 million years of age.

A

  †Alethopteris
 †Alethopteris decurrens
 †Alethopteris lonchitica
 †Alethopteris valida
 †Allocatillocrinus
 †Allocatillocrinus rotundus
 †Alloiopteris
 †Alloiopteris georgiana – or unidentified comparable form
 †Alokistocare
 †Alokistocare americanum
 †Ambonychia
 †Ambonychia intermedia
 †Amplexipora
 †Amplexipora colombiana
 †Amplexipora columbiana
 †Amplexus
 †Amplexus hamiltoniae
 †Anazyga
 †Anazyga recurvirostra
 †Ancisrorhyncha
 †Ancisrorhyncha costata
 †Ancistrorhynca
 †Ancistrorhynca costata
 †Ancistrorhyncha
 †Ancistrorhyncha costata
 †Aneimites
 †Aneimites pottsvillensis
  †Annularia
 †Annularia asteris
 †Annularia radiata
 †Anoplotheca
 †Anoplotheca hemispherica
 †Anthracospirifer
 †Anthracospirifer leidyi
 †Archaeopteridium
 †Archaeopteridium tschermacki
 †Archaeorthis – tentative report
 †Archeopteris
  †Archimedes
 †Archimedes confertus
 †Archimedes invaginatus
 †Archimedes magnus
 †Archimedes swallovanus
 †Armonia
 †Armonia elongata
 †Arthroclema
 †Arthroclema armatum
  †Asaphiscus
 †Asaphiscus gregarius
 †Asphelaspis
 †Asphelaspis hamblensis
 †Asterophyllites
 †Asterophyllites charaeformis
 †Asterophyllites equisetiformis
 †Asterophyllites grandis
 †Atactoporella
 †Athyrisina
  †Atrypa
 †Atrypa reticularis
 †Augustoceras

B

 †Baltagnostus
 †Baltagnostus centerensis
 †Bathocypris
 †Bathocypris cylindrica
 †Bathyurus
 †Batostoma
 †Batostoma implicatum
 †Batostoma magnapora
 †Batostoma minnesotense
 †Batostoma varum
 †Batostoma winchelli
 †Blainia
 †Blainia gregaria
 †Bonneterrina – tentative report
 †Brooksella
 †Brooksella alternata

C

  †Calamites
 †Calamites cistiiformis
 †Calamites suckowi
  †Callipteridium
 †Callipteridium membranaceum – or unidentified comparable form
 †Callopora
 †Callopora andrewsi
 †Callopora dalei
 †Callopora dumalis
 †Callopora goodhuensis
 †Callopora multitabulata
 †Callopora pulchella – tentative report
 †Callopora ramosa
 †Callopora sigillaroides
 †Callopora subnodosa
 †Calymene
  †Calymene celebra
 †Calymene platys
 †Calymene ragdesi
 †Calyptaulax
 †Calyptaulax callicephala
 †Camarotoechia
 †Campophyllum
 †Campophylum
 †Campophylum gasperense
 †Carpentertypus
 †Carpentertypus durhami – type locality for species
 †Ceratopea
 †Ceratopea calceoliformis
 †Ceratopea grandis – or unidentified comparable form
 †Ceratopea sulcata
 †Chaetetes
 †Choctawites
 †Choctawites kentuckiensis
  †Cincinnetina
 †Cincinnetina meeki
 †Cincinnetina multisecta
 †Cincosaurus
 †Cincosaurus cobbi
 †Cleistopora
 †Clyclostomiceras
 †Clyclostomiceras cassinense
 †Columnaria
 †Columnaria halli
  †Constellaria
 †Constellaria prominens
 †Coosella
 †Coosella curticei
 †Coosia
 †Coosia superba
 †Cordaites
 †Cordaites communis
 †Cordaites serpens
 †Cryptophagmus
 †Cryptophagmus antiquatus
 †Cryptophragmus
 †Cryptophragmus antiquatus
 †Cyclospira
 †Cyclostomiceras
 †Cyclostomiceras cassinense
 †Cyperites
  †Cyrtoceras
 †Cyrtoceras vallandinghami

D

 †Dalmanella
 †Dalmanella edgewoodensis
 †Dalmanella elegantula
 †Dalmanitina
 †Dalmanitina arkansana
 †Dekayella
 †Dekayella praenuntia
 †Dekayella ulrichi
 †Dekayia
 †Dekayia aspera
 †Desmorthis
 †Desmorthis nevadensis
 †Dielasma
 †Dielasma arkansanum
 †Dielasma illinoisensis
 †Dinorthis
 †Dinorthis atavoides – or unidentified comparable form
  †Dipleura
 †Dipleura dekayi
 †Diplothmena
 †Diplothmena cheathami
 †Doleroides
 †Doleroides gibbosus

E

   †Elrathia
 †Elrathia antiquata
 †Elrathiella
 †Elrathiella buttsi
 †Elrathina – tentative report
 †Eodictyonella (formerly Dictyonella)
 †Eodictyonella reticulata
 †Eospirifer
 †Eospirifer radiatus
 †Eremopteris
 †Eremopteris microphylla – or unidentified comparable form
 †Eridotrypa
 †Eridotrypa mutabilis
 †Eroicaspira
 †Eroicaspira bellicincta
 †Escharopora
 †Escharopora falciformis
 †Escharopora subrecta
 †Eteraspis
 †Eteraspis glabra
 †Eumetria
 †Eumetria verneuiliana
 †Eurydictya
 †Eurydictya multipora
 †Eusphenopteris
 †Eusphenopteris aldrichii

F

 †Fascifera
 †Fascifera subcarinata
 †Favistella
 †Favistella halli
  †Favosites
 †Favosites turbinatus
 †Fenestrellina
 †Fenestrellina santiludowici
 †Fenestrellina tenax
 †Finkelnburgia
  †Flexicalymene

G

 †Glyphaspis
 †Glyphaspis capella – or unidentified comparable form
 †Glyprorthis
 †Glyprorthis bellarugosa
 †Glyptorthis
 †Glyptorthis bellarugosa
 †Glyptorthis insculpta
 †Glyptorthis multicostellata – type locality for species
 †Gonioceras
 †Gonioceras anceps

H

 †Hadrophyllum
 †Hadrophyllum ovale
   †Hallopora
 †Hallopora dalei
 †Hebertella
 †Hebertella frankfortenis
 †Hebertella frankfortensis
 †Hebertella occidentalis
 †Hebertella sinuata
 †Helicotoma
 †Helicotoma tennesseensis
 †Helopora
 †Helopora spiniformis
 †Hemiphragmus
 †Hemiphragmus imperfectus
 †Hesperorthis
 †Hesperorthis tricenaria
 †Heterotrypa
 †Heterotrypa frondosa
 †Heterotrypa parvulipora
 †Hiscobeccus
 †Hiscobeccus capax
 †Hocospermum
 †Holcacephalus – tentative report
 †Holcospermum
 †Homotrypa
 †Homotrypa cincinnatiensis
 †Homotrypa curvata
 †Homotrypa cylindrica
 †Homotrypa flabellaris
 †Homotrypa grandis
 †Homotrypa minnesotensis
 †Homotrypa obliqua
 †Homotrypa rubramosa
 †Homotrypa subramosa
 †Hormotoma
 †Hormotoma gracilis
 †Horomotoma
 †Horomotoma bellicincta

I

 †Idiostrophis
 †Isochilina
 †Isochilina nelsoni
  †Isotelus
 †Isotelus brachycephalus

K

 †Kenenglundii
 †Kenenglundii penningtonensis
 †Kingopora

L

 †Lambeophyllum
 †Lambeophyllum profundum
 †Lambeophylum
 †Lambeophylum profundum
 †Leanospira
 †Lecanospira
 †Lecanospira compacta
 †Lecanospira knoxvillensis – type locality for species
 †Lecanospira salteri – or unidentified comparable form
 †Lecanospira sigmoidea
 †Leperditia
 †Leperditia fabulites
  †Lepidodendron
 †Lepidodendron aculeatum
 †Lepidodendron obovatum
 †Lepidodendron rimosum
 †Lepidophloios
 †Lepidophloios laricinus
 †Lepidostrobophyllum
 †Leptaena
 †Leptotrypa
 †Leptotrypa clavis
 †Lichenaria
  †Lingula
 †Liospira
 †Liospira progne
 †Liospira vitruvia
 †Liospita
 †Lithostrotion
 †Lithostrotion proliferum
 †Lithostrotionella
 †Lithostrotionella castelnaui
 †Lophospira
 †Lophospira burginensis
 †Lophospira serrulata
  †Lyginopteris
 †Lyropora
 †Lyropora ranosculum

M

 †Maclurites
 †Macrostachya
 †Meekopora
 †Meekopora clausa
 †Michelinoceras
 †Michelinoceras multicameratum
 †Michelinoceras sociale
 †Mimella
 †Mimella borealis
 †Mimella melonica
 †Monotrypa
 †Monotrypa intabulata
 †Monticulipora
 †Monticulopora
 †Multicostata
 †Multicostella
 †Murchisonia
 †Murchisonia subulata

N

 †Neuralethopteris
 †Neuralethopteris biformis
 †Neuralethopteris larishii
 †Neuralethopteris pocahontas
  †Neuropteris
 †Neuropteris flexuosa
 †Neuropteris heterophylla – or unidentified comparable form
 †Neuropteris hollandica
 †Neuropteris plicata
 †Neuropteris schlehani
 †Neuropteris smithi
 †Neuropteris smithii
 †Nicholsonella

O

 †Oepikina
 †Oepikina minnesotensis
 †Ophileta
 †Ophileta complanata
 †Ophileta laevata
 †Orospira
  †Orthoceras
 †Orthorhynchula
 †Orthorhynchula linneyi
 †Oxoplecia
 †Oxoplecia holstonensis

P

 †Pachidictya
 †Pachydictya
 †Pachydictya foliata
 †Palmatopteris
 †Palmatopteris furcata
 †Paupospira
 †Paupospira bowdeni
 †Paupospira burginensis
  †Pecopteris
 †Pecopteris elliptica – tentative report
 †Pelagiella
 †Penniretopora
 †Pentamerus
 †Pentamerus oblongus
  †Pentremites
 †Pentremites cava
 †Peronopsis
 †Peronopsis cuneifera – or unidentified comparable form
 †Petigophora
 †Petogophora
  †Phacops
 †Phacops pulchellus
 †Phragmolites
 †Phragmolites fimbriata
 †Phragmolutes
 †Phragmolutes fimbriatus
 †Pionodema
 †Pionodema miniscula
 †Pionodema minuscula
 †Pionodema subaequata
 †Platycrinites
 †Platycrinites hemisphericus
 †Platystophia
 †Platystophia trentonensis
  †Platystrophia
 †Platystrophia acutilirata
 †Platystrophia colbiensis
 †Platystrophia crassa
 †Platystrophia elegantula
 †Platystrophia juvensis
 †Platystrophia laticosta
 †Platystrophia ponderosa
 †Platystrophia precursor
 †Platystrophia strigosa
 †Platystrophia sublaticosa
 †Platystrophia trentonensis
 †Plectorthis
 †Plectorthis fissicosta
 †Plectorthis plicatella
  †Pleurodictyum
 †Prasopora
 †Prasopora hospitalis
 †Prismostylus
 †Prismostylus fibratum
 †Productina
 †Protozyga

R

 †Rafinesquina
 †Rafinesquina alternata
 †Rafinesquina deltoidea – or unidentified comparable form
 †Rafinesquina trentonensis
 †Raphistoma
 †Reserella
 †Reserella rogata
 †Resserella
 †Resserella rogata
 †Rhinidictya
 †Rhinidictya mutabilis
 †Rhipidomella
 †Rhipidomena
 †Rhipidomena tennesseensis
 †Rhombotrypa
 †Rhynchotrema
 †Rhynchotrema argenturbiem
 †Rhynchotrema increbescens
 †Rhynchotrema minnesotensis
 †Rhynidictya
 †Rhynidictya mutabilis
 †Rostricella
 †Rostricella plena
 Rostricellula
 †Rostricellula rostrata

S

 †Scalites
 †Scalites peracutum
 †Septopora
 †Septopora subquadrans
 †Sibulites
 †Sibulites subelongatus – or unidentified related form
  †Sigillaria
 †Sigillaria elegans
 †Sigillaria mammillaris – tentative report
 †Solenopleurella
 †Solenopleurella buttsi
 †Solenopora
 †Solenopora compacta
 †Sowerbyella
 †Sowerbyella curdsvillensis
  †Sphenophyllum
 †Sphenophyllum cuneifolium
 †Sphenophyllum tenue
 †Sphenopteris
 †Sphenopteris deltiformis
 †Sphenopteris elegans – or unidentified comparable form
 †Sphenopteris hoeninghausi
 †Sphenopteris hoeninghausii
 †Sphenopteris pottsvillea
  †Spirifer
 †Spirifer grimesi
 †Stictoporella
 †Stigmaria
 †Stigmaria ficoides
 †Streblopteria
 †Streblopteria cooperensi
 †Streptelasm
 †Streptelasma
 †Streptelasma produndum
 †Strictoporella
 †Stromatocerium
 †Stromatocerium pustolosum
 †Stromatocerium pustulosum
 †Stromatocerium rugosum
  †Strophomena
 †Strophomena incurvata
 †Strophomena planumbona
 †Subulites
 †Subulites subelongatus – or unidentified related form

T

 †Tetradium
 †Tetradium cellulosum
 †Tetradium columnare
 †Tetradium syringoporoides
  †Tricrepicephalus
 †Tricrepicephalus cedarensis
 †Triplophylum
 †Triplophylum compressus
 †Triplophylum dalei

V

 †Valcourea
 †Valcouroceras

Z

 †Zaphrenthis
 †Zaphrenthis radicosa
 †Zeilleria
 †Zeilleria delicatula
 †Zygospira
 †Zygospira modesta
 †Zygospira recurivirostris

References
 

Paleozoic
Georgia